Sybra striatopunctata is a species of beetle in the family Cerambycidae. It was described by Stephan von Breuning in 1939.

It's 7–11 mm long and 2⅔–3½ mm wide, and its type locality is Fauro Island, Solomon Islands.

References

striatopunctata
Beetles described in 1939
Taxa named by Stephan von Breuning (entomologist)